Steve Williams (born 5 October 1982) is an Australian-born German international rugby union player, having played for the SC Neuenheim and the German national rugby union team. He has also played club rugby at highest level in Scotland, the Netherlands and Portugal.

Biography
Williams has been playing rugby since 1988, and hails from Alstonville, New South Wales. Williams qualified to play for Germany through his German mother and, after backpacking through Europe and watching Australia play in the 2007 Rugby World Cup, he had a trial for Germany, which he passed. He impressed Germany's director of rugby, Peter Ianusevici, enough to field him in Germany's next game.

He made his debut for Germany on 24 November 2007, three days after his trial, a 34–5 victory against Moldova in Heidelberg. He neither speaks German nor was he able to sing the German national anthem, but he indicated his willingness to learn both for the upcoming spring tests in early 2008. His debut for Germany however meant, he was not eligible to play for his native country Australia in the future, as the International Rugby Board allows a player to play for only one country.

Williams played three games for the team in the 2006-2008 European Nations Cup Second Division, his last on 26 April 2008, against the Netherlands, with Germany winning all three of them and securing promotion to the 2008-2010 European Nations Cup First Division.

After his stint in Europe and playing for Germany, he now again plays in Australia, for Mosman Rugby Club. He is a European and Business Studies student at Sydney's Macquarie University. Williams was supposed to play for SC Neuenheim in the 2008–09 Bundesliga season but, despite being confirmed by the club as a transfer, did not travel to Europe to play for the team.

Honours

National team
 European Nations Cup – Division 2
 Champions: 2008

Stats
Steve Williams's personal statistics in club and international rugby:

National team

 As of 5 March 2010

References

External links
 Steve Williams at scrum.com
   Steve Williams at totalrugby.de

1982 births
Living people
Australian rugby union players
German rugby union players
Germany international rugby union players
Australian people of German descent
SC Neuenheim players
Rugby union props
Macquarie University alumni
Australian expatriate rugby union players
Expatriate rugby union players in Scotland
Australian expatriate sportspeople in Scotland
People from the Northern Rivers
Rugby union players from New South Wales